Ethnic broadcasting in China comprises both radio and TV broadcasting for some of the numerous ethnic groups within the country. Stations are found on the administrative levels of the nation as a whole, provinces, prefectures, and counties. They form a part of the ethnic media of China.

National level

Radio

Television
On television there are dubbed versions of the main central news programme Xinwen Lianbo in minority languages.

Provincial and prefectural level
On provincial level there were 36 broadcasters in 2022; 8 of them had minority language programmes. On prefectural level there were about 350 broadcasters; about 40 of them carried programmes in minority languages.

Xinjiang Uyghur Autonomous Region

On prefectural level there were 13 stations with programmes in Uyghur (including Ürümqi), Kazakh (Ili, Tacheng, Altay), Kyrgyz (Kizilsu), and Mongolian (Bortala and Bayingolin). Within the 8th Division of the Xinjiang Production and Construction Corps there was the Shihezi People's Broadcasting Station with programmes in Uyghur.

Inner Mongolia Autonomous Region

On prefectural level there were 12 stations with programmes in Mongolian (including Hohhot and Ordos).

Liaoning Province
In Liaoning there was 1 station with programmes in Mongolian on prefectural level (Fuxin).

Heilongjiang Province

Jilin Province
In Jilin there was 1 station with programmes in Korean on prefectural level (Yanbian).

Tibet Autonomous Region

On prefectural level there were 7 stations with programmes in Tibetan (including Lhasa).

Qinghai Province

On prefectural level there were 2 stations with programmes in Tibetan (Haixi and Yushu).

Gansu Province
In Gansu there was 1 station with programmes in Tibetan on prefectural level (Gannan).

Sichuan Province

On prefectural level there were 2 stations with programmes in Tibetan (Garzê and Ngawa) and 1 station with programmes in Nuosu (Liangshan).

Yunnan Province

On prefectural level there were 3 stations with minority language programmes (Dêqên Tibetan, Dehong Dai and Jingpo, Xishuangbanna Dai).

Guangxi Zhuang Autonomous Region

References

Literature
 NRTA: 国家广播电视总局 播出机构（频道）
 
 , urn:nbn:de:gbv:547-200900052

Mass media in China
Television in minority languages